The Swan 43 is a Sailboat designed by Olin Stephens and built by Nautor's Swan and was one of the initial two models launched in the companies founding year alongside the Swan 36.

External links
 Nautor Swan
 S&S Blog
 Class Swan Owner Association

References

Sailing yachts
Keelboats
1960s sailboat type designs
Sailboat types built by Nautor Swan
Sailboat type designs by Sparkman and Stephens
Sailboat type designs by Olin Stephens